Cutlers' Hall is a Grade II* listed building in Sheffield, England, that is the headquarters of the Company of Cutlers in Hallamshire. It is located on Church Street, opposite Sheffield Cathedral, in Sheffield City Centre.

History and architecture
The Cutlers' Hall was built in 1832 by Samuel Worth and Benjamin Broomhead Taylor at a cost of £6,500. It was extended in 1865–7 by Flockton & Abbott, and again in 1888 by J. B. Mitchel-Withers. It is Sheffield's third Cutlers' Hall, the previous buildings, which were built in the same location, were constructed in 1638 and 1725. Prior to 1638, the cutlers met in rented accommodation with tradition saying that this was a public house on Fargate, although there is no documentary evidence to back this up. The first Cutlers' Hall, a stone building with a slated roof, was built in 1638 at a cost of £155 15s 10d, of which £57 18s 4d was raised by subscription. The building was quickly found to be inadequate, having to be repaired on many occasions and in 1725, a new Cutlers' Hall was erected on the same site at a cost of £442. It was an attractive, narrow Georgian three storeyed building with a string course cornice. Towards the end of the 18th century the Cutlers' Hall was used as an overspill court room as the Town Hall across Church Street could not cope with the increasing number of crimes. 

The Hall's front is of the Corinthian order. Behind the classical façade is an intricate series of rooms which reach back almost as far as Fargate. The banks neighbouring the Cutlers' Hall are in a similar style.  One was designed by Samuel Worth in 1838, the other was completed in 1867.

Function

There is a selection of old Hallamshire knives on show inside the hall, some of which go back to the Elizabethan era. Many of the knives were discovered by Thames mudlarks in the tidal mud of the River Thames in London. Also on display is the Norfolk Knife, a very large pocket knife with 75 blades which was made by Joseph Rodgers and Sons at their Norfolk Street Works in Sheffield for the Crystal Palace Great Exhibition of 1851.

The building is used for many of the grandest events in the city's civic and commercial life, for instance the annual Cutlers' Feast which became an annual event in 1648. For the years up to 2008, there were 372 Cutlers' Feasts, with breaks only for the World Wars and a cancellation in 1921.

The Cutlers' Hall is maintained by the Cutlers' Hall Preservation Trust, a registered charity.

See also
Company of Cutlers in Hallamshire
Master Cutler
Listed buildings in Sheffield

References

External links

Cutlers' Feast of Sheffield, 1867
Cutlers' Hall Exclusive Virtual Walk-through Tour via Matterport

Grade II* listed buildings in Sheffield
Commercial buildings completed in 1832
1832 establishments in the United Kingdom